The Office of Terrorism and Financial Intelligence (TFI), formed in 2004, is an agency of the United States Department of the Treasury. TFI works to reduce the use of the financial system for illicit activities by terrorists (groups and state-sponsored), money launderers, drug cartels, and other national security threats.

The Office of Terrorism and Financial Intelligence is headed by the Under Secretary of the Treasury for Terrorism and Financial Intelligence who is appointed by the president and confirmed by the Senate. The position was vacant after the departure of Sigal Mandelker in October 2019. In December 2021, Brian E. Nelson was confirmed by the Senate in a 50-49 vote as the next Under Secretary.

TFI oversees the Office of Terrorist Financing and Financial Crimes, the Office of Intelligence and Analysis, the Office of Foreign Assets Control, the Financial Crime Enforcement Network and the Treasury Executive Office for Asset Forfeiture.

The U.S. Treasury Department is the only national finance ministry with its own in-house intelligence agency, with offices around the world, including Islamabad and Abu Dhabi.

History 
The TFI was founded in 2004. Its first Under Secretary was Stuart A. Levey who was sworn in on July 21, 2004. He was a political appointee of President George W. Bush and President Obama asked Levey to remain in the position. Levey served until March 2011 and was succeeded by David S. Cohen on June 30, 2011. He left the position on February 9, 2015, and was succeeded by Adam J. Szubin who acted in the position from April 16, 2015, to February 13, 2017. Sigal Mandelker was nominated for the position by President Donald Trump in March 2017, and confirmed by the Senate on June 21, 2017.  The position was vacant after Mandelker's departure in October 2019.

On May 26, 2021, President Joe Biden nominated Nelson to serve as Under Secretary of the Treasury for Terrorism and Financial Intelligence. On June 22, 2021, the Senate's Banking Committee held hearings on Nelson's nomination. The committee deadlocked on his nomination on October 5, 2021, in a party-line vote. The entire Senate discharged his nomination from the committee on October 19, 2021, in a 50-49 vote. On December 2, 2021, Nelson was confirmed by the Senate in a 50-49 vote.

References

External links

Terrorism and Financial Intelligence
Financial crime prevention
Intelligence analysis agencies